The olm or proteus (Proteus anguinus) is an aquatic salamander in the genus Proteus of the family Proteidae, the only exclusively cave-dwelling chordate species found in Europe. In contrast to most amphibians, it is entirely aquatic, eating, sleeping, and breeding underwater. Living in caves found in the Dinaric Alps, it is endemic to the waters that flow underground through the extensive limestone bedrock of the karst of Central and Southeastern Europe in the basin of the Soča River near Trieste, Italy, southwestern Croatia, and Bosnia and Herzegovina. Introduced populations are found near Vicenza, Italy, and Kranj, Slovenia. It was first mentioned in 1689 by the local naturalist Valvasor in his Glory of the Duchy of Carniola, who reported that, after heavy rains, the olms were washed up from the underground waters and were believed by local people to be a cave dragon's offspring.

This cave salamander is most notable for its adaptations to a life of complete darkness in its underground habitat. The olm's eyes are undeveloped, leaving it blind, while its other senses, particularly those of smell and hearing, are acutely developed. It also lacks any pigmentation in its skin. It has three toes on its forelimbs, but only two toes on its hind feet. It exhibits neoteny, retaining larval characteristics like external gills into adulthood, like some American amphibians, the axolotl and the mudpuppies (Necturus). The olm is the only species in the genus Proteus and the only European species of the family Proteidae, whose other extant genus is Necturus.

Etymology 
The word olm is a German loanword that was incorporated into English in the late 19th century. The origin of the German  or  'cave olm', is unclear. It may be a variant of the word  'salamander'.

Common names 
In Slovenia, it is called močeril (from *močerъ 'earthworm, damp creepy-crawly'; moča 'dampness').

Description

External appearance

The average length is between 23-25 cm. Females grow larger than males, but otherwise the primary external difference between the sexes is in the cloaca region (shape and size) when breeding. The trunk is cylindrical, uniformly thick, and segmented with regularly spaced furrows at the myomere borders. The tail is relatively short, laterally flattened, and surrounded by a thin fin. The limbs are small and thin, with a reduced number of digits compared to other amphibians: the front legs have three digits instead of the normal four, and the rear have two digits instead of five. Its body is covered by a thin layer of skin, which contains very little of the pigment riboflavin, making it yellowish-white or pink in color.

The white skin color of the olm retains the ability to produce melanin, and will gradually turn dark when exposed to light; in some cases the larvae are also colored. Its pear-shaped head ends with a short, dorsoventrally flattened snout. The mouth opening is small, with tiny teeth forming a sieve to keep larger particles inside the mouth. The nostrils are so small as to be imperceptible, but are placed somewhat laterally near the end of the snout. The regressed eyes are covered by a layer of skin. The olm breathes with external gills that form two branched tufts at the back of the head. They are red in color because the oxygen-rich blood shows through the non-pigmented skin. The olm also has rudimentary lungs, but their role in respiration is only accessory, except during hypoxic conditions.

Sensory organs
Cave-dwelling animals have been prompted, among other adaptations, to develop and improve non-visual sensory systems in order to orient in and adapt to permanently dark habitats. The olm's sensory system is also adapted to life in the subterranean aquatic environment. Unable to use vision for orientation, the olm compensates with other senses, which are better developed than in amphibians living on the surface. It retains larval proportions, like a long, slender body and a large, flattened head, and is thus able to carry a larger number of sensory receptors.

Photoreceptors
Although blind, the olm swims away from light. The eyes are regressed, but retain sensitivity. They lie deep below the dermis of the skin and are rarely visible except in some younger adults. Larvae have normal eyes, but development soon stops and they start regressing, finally atrophying after four months of development. The pineal body also has photoreceptive cells which, though regressed, retain visual pigment like the photoreceptive cells of the regressed eye. The pineal gland in Proteus probably possesses some control over the physiological processes. Behavioral experiments revealed that the skin itself is also sensitive to light. Photosensitivity of the integument is due to the pigment melanopsin inside specialized cells called melanophores. Preliminary immunocytochemical analyses support the existence of photosensitive pigment also in the animal's integument.

Chemoreceptors

The olm is capable of sensing very low concentrations of organic compounds in the water. They are better at sensing both the quantity and quality of prey by smell than related amphibians. The nasal epithelium, located on the inner surface of the nasal cavity and in the Jacobson's organ, is thicker than in other amphibians. The taste buds are in the mucous epithelium of the mouth, most of them on the upper side of the tongue and on the entrance to the gill cavities. Those in the oral cavity are used for tasting food, where those near the gills probably sense chemicals in the surrounding water.

Mechano- and electroreceptors
The sensory epithelia of the inner ear are very specifically differentiated, enabling the olm to receive sound waves in the water, as well as vibrations from the ground. The complex functional-morphological orientation of the sensory cells enables the animal to register the sound sources. As this animal stays neotenic throughout its long life span, it is only occasionally exposed to normal adult hearing in air, which is probably also possible for Proteus as in most salamanders. Hence, it would be of adaptive value in caves, with no vision available, to profit from underwater hearing by recognizing particular sounds and eventual localization of prey or other sound sources, i.e. acoustical orientation in general. The ethological experiments indicate that the best hearing sensitivity of Proteus is between 10 Hz and up to 15,000 Hz. The lateral line supplements inner ear sensitivity by registering low-frequency nearby water displacements.

A new type of electroreception sensory organ has been analyzed on the head of Proteus, utilizing light and electron microscopy. These new organs have been described as ampullary organs.

Like some other lower vertebrates, the olm has the ability to register weak electric fields. Some behavioral experiments suggest that the olm may be able to use Earth's magnetic field to orient itself. In 2002, Proteus anguinus was found to align itself with natural and artificially modified magnetic fields.

Ecology and life history

The black olm may occur in surface waters that are somewhat warmer.

The larvae gain adult appearance after nearly four months, with the duration of development strongly correlating with water temperature. Unconfirmed historical observations of viviparity exist, but it has been shown that the females possess a gland that produces the egg casing, similar to those of fish and egg-laying amphibians. Paul Kammerer reported that female olm gave birth to live young in water at or below  and laid eggs at higher, but rigorous observations have not confirmed that. The olm appears to be exclusively oviparous.

The average is 35 eggs and the adult female typically breeds every 12.5 years.

Development of the olm and other troglobite amphibians is characterized by heterochrony – the animal does not undergo metamorphosis and instead retains larval features. The form of heterochrony in the olm is neoteny – delayed somatic maturity with precocious reproductive maturity, i.e. reproductive maturity is reached while retaining the larval external morphology. In other amphibians, the metamorphosis is regulated by the hormone thyroxine, secreted by the thyroid gland. The thyroid is normally developed and functioning in the olm, so the lack of metamorphosis is due to the unresponsiveness of key tissues to thyroxine.

The olm swims by eel-like twisting of its body, assisted only slightly by its poorly developed legs. It is a predatory animal, feeding on small crustaceans (for example, Troglocaris shrimp, Niphargus, Asellus and Synurella amphipods and Oniscus asellus), snails (for example, Belgrandiella) and occasionally insects and insect larvae (for example, Trichoptera, Ephemeroptera, Plecoptera and Diptera). It does not chew its food, instead swallowing it whole. The olm is resistant to long-term starvation, an adaptation to its underground habitat. It can consume large amounts of food at once, and store nutrients as large deposits of lipids and glycogen in the liver. When food is scarce, it reduces its activity and metabolic rate, and can also reabsorb its own tissues in severe cases. Controlled experiments have shown that an olm can survive up to 10 years without food.

Olms are gregarious, and usually aggregate either under stones or in fissures. Sexually active males are an exception, establishing and defending territories where they attract females. The scarcity of food makes fighting energetically costly, so encounters between males usually only involve display. This is a behavioral adaptation to life underground.

Breeding
Reproduction has only been observed in captivity so far. Sexually mature males have swollen cloacas, brighter skin color, two lines at the side of the tail, and slightly curled fins. No such changes have been observed in the females. The male can start courtship even without the presence of a female. He chases other males away from the chosen area, and may then secrete a female-attracting pheromone. When the female approaches, he starts to circle around her and fan her with his tail. Then he starts to touch the female's body with his snout, and the female touches his cloaca with her snout. At that point, he starts to move forward with a twitching motion, and the female follows. He then deposits the spermatophore, and the animals keep moving forward until the female hits it with her cloaca, after which she stops and stands still. The spermatophore sticks to her and the sperm cells swim inside her cloaca, where they attempt to fertilize her eggs. The courtship ritual can be repeated several times over a couple of hours.

Longevity is estimated at up to 58 years. A study published in Biology Letters estimated that they have a maximum lifespan of over 100 years and that the lifespan of an average adult is around 68.5 years. When compared to the longevity and body mass of other amphibians, olms are outliers, living longer than would be predicted from their size.

Taxonomic history
Olms from different cave systems differ substantially in body measurements, color and some microscopic characteristics. Earlier researchers used these differences to support the division into five species, while modern herpetologists understand that external morphology is not reliable for amphibian systematics and can be extremely variable, depending on nourishment, illness, and other factors; even varying among individuals in a single population. Proteus anguinus is now considered a single species. The length of the head is the most obvious difference between the various populations – individuals from Stična, Slovenia, have shorter heads on average than those from Tržič, Slovenia, and the Istrian peninsula, for example.

Black olm

The black olm (Proteus anguinus parkelj Sket & Arntzen, 1994) is the only other recognized subspecies of the olm. It was first found in 1986 by members of the Slovenian Karst Research Institute, who were exploring the water from Dobličica karst spring in the White Carniola region.

It has several features separating it from the nominotypical subspecies (Proteus a. anguinus):

These features suggest that the black olm has probably colonized underground habitats more recently and still retains some nontroglomorphic characteristics.

Research history
The first written mention of the olm is in Johann Weikhard von Valvasor's The Glory of the Duchy of Carniola (1689) as a baby dragon. Heavy rains of Slovenia would wash the olms up from their subterranean habitat, giving rise to the folklore belief that great dragons lived beneath the Earth's crust, and the olms were the undeveloped offspring of these mythical beasts. In his book Valvasor compiled the local Slovenian folk stories and pieced together the rich mythology of the creature and documented observations of the olm as "Barely a span long, akin to a lizard, in short, a worm and vermin of which there are many hereabouts".

The first researcher to retrieve a live olm was a physician and researcher from Idrija, Giovanni Antonio Scopoli, who sent dead specimens and drawings to colleagues and collectors. Josephus Nicolaus Laurenti, though, was the first to briefly describe the olm in 1768 and give it the scientific name Proteus anguinus. It was not until the end of the century that Carl Franz Anton Ritter von Schreibers from the Naturhistorisches Museum of Vienna started to look into this animal's anatomy. The specimens were sent to him by Sigmund Zois. Schreibers presented his findings in 1801 to The Royal Society in London, and later also in Paris. Soon, the olm started to gain wide recognition and attract significant attention, resulting in thousands of animals being sent to researchers and collectors worldwide. A Dr Edwards was quoted in a book of 1839 as believing that "...the Proteus Anguinis is the first stage of an animal prevented from growing to perfection by inhabiting the subterraneous waters of Carniola."

In 1880 Marie von Chauvin began the first long-term study of olms in captivity. She learned that they detected prey's motion, panicked when a heavy object was dropped near their habitat, and developed color if exposed to weak light for a few hours a day, but could not cause them to change to a land-dwelling adult form, as she and others had done with axolotl.

The basis of functional morphological investigations in Slovenia was set up by Lili Istenič in the 1980s. More than twenty years later, the Research Group for functional morphological Studies of the Vertebrates in the Department of Biology (Biotechnical Faculty, University of Ljubljana), is one of the leading groups studying the olm under the guidance of Boris Bulog. There are also several cave laboratories in Europe in which olms have been introduced and are being studied. These are Moulis, Ariège (France), Kent's Cavern (England), Han-sur-Lesse (Belgium) and Aggtelek (Hungary). They were also introduced into the Hermannshöhle (Germany) and Oliero (Italy) caves, where they still live today. Additionally, there is evidence that a small number of olms were introduced to the United Kingdom in the 1940s, although it's highly likely that the animals perished shortly after being released.

The olm was used by Charles Darwin in his seminal work On the Origin of Species as an example for the reduction of structures through disuse:

An olm (Proteus) genome project is currently underway by the University of Ljubljana and BGI. With an estimated genome size roughly 15-times the size of human genome, this will likely be the largest animal genome sequenced so far.

Conservation
The olm is extremely vulnerable to changes in its environment, due to its adaptation to the specific conditions in caves. Water resources in the karst are extremely sensitive to all kinds of pollution. The contamination of the karst underground waters is due to the large number of waste disposal sites leached by rainwater, as well as to the accidental overflow of various liquids. The reflection of such pollution in the karst underground waters depends on the type and quantity of pollutants, and on the rock structure through which the waters penetrate. Self-purification processes in the underground waters are not completely understood, but they are quite different from those in surface waters.

Among the most serious chemical pollutants are chlorinated hydrocarbon pesticides, fertilizers, polychlorinated biphenyls (PCBs), which are or were used in a variety of industrial processes and in the manufacture of many kinds of materials; and metals such as mercury, lead, cadmium, and arsenic. All of these substances persist in the environment, being slowly, if at all, degraded by natural processes. In addition, all are toxic to life if they accumulate in any appreciable quantity.

The olm was included in annexes II and IV of the 1992 EU Habitats Directive (92/43/EEC). The list of species in annex II, combined with the habitats listed in annex I, is used by individual countries to designate protected areas known as 'Special Areas of Conservation'. These areas, combined with others created by the older Birds Directive were to form the Natura 2000 network. Annex IV additionally lists "animal and plant species of community interest in need of strict protection", although this has little legal ramifications. Postojna Cave and other caves inhabited by the olm were eventually included in the Slovenian part of the Natura 2000 network. Capturing or killing olm is allowed only under specific circumstances determined by the local authorities (i.e. scientific study).

The olm was first protected in Slovenia in 1922 along with all cave fauna, but the protection was not effective and a substantial black market came into existence. In 1982 it was placed on a list of rare and endangered species. This list also had the effect of prohibiting trade of the species. After joining the European Union in 2004, Slovenia had to establish mechanisms for protection of the species included in the EU Habitats Directive. The olm is included in a Slovenian Red list of endangered species.

In Croatia, the olm is protected by the legislation designed to protect amphibians – collecting is possible only for research purposes by permission of the National Administration for Nature and Environment Protection. As of 2020 the Croatian population has been assessed as 'critically endangered' in Croatia. As of 1999, the environmental laws in Bosnia and Herzegovina and Montenegro had not yet been clarified for this species.

In the 1980s the IUCN claimed that some illegal collection of this species for the pet trade took place, but that the extent of this was unknown: this text has been copied into all subsequent assessments. Since the 1980s until the most recent assessment in 2008 the organisation has rated the conservation status for the IUCN Red List as 'vulnerable', this because of its natural distribution being fragmented over a number of cave systems as opposed to being continuous, and what they consider a decline in extent and quality of its habitat, which they assume means that the population has been decreasing for the last 40 years.

Zagreb Zoo is a zoo in Croatia that houses the olm. Olms were until recently formerly kept in numerous zoos in Germany, as well as in the UK, Belgium and Slovenia. At present they can only be experienced at Zagreb Zoo, Hermannshöhle in Germany and Vivarium Proteus (Proteus Vivarium) within Postojnska jama (Postojna Cave) in Slovenia. There are also captive breeding programs in France and Germany.

Cultural significance
The olm is a symbol of Slovenian natural heritage. The enthusiasm of scientists and the broader public about this inhabitant of Slovenian caves is still strong 300 years after its discovery. Postojna Cave is one of the birthplaces of biospeleology due to the olm and other rare cave inhabitants, such as the blind cave beetle. The image of the olm contributes significantly to the fame of Postojna Cave, which Slovenia successfully utilizes for the promotion of ecotourism in Postojna and other parts of Slovenian karst. Tours of Postojna Cave also include a tour around the speleobiological station – the Proteus vivarium, showing different aspects of the cave environment.

The olm was also depicted on one of the Slovenian tolar coins. It was also the namesake of Proteus, the oldest Slovenian popular science magazine, first published in 1933.

References

External links

EDGE of Existence Olm information
Flora and Fauna of Caves: Proteus anguinus
Proteus magazine 
Slovenian practice example: Human Fish (Proteus anguinus)
The olm on ARKive – pictures, films
The olm on the pages of the Slovenian Natural history museum 
The Global Amphibian Assessment – Proteus anguinus

Amphibians of Europe
Amphibians described in 1768
Cave salamanders
Electroreceptive animals
Fauna of Bosnia and Herzegovina
Fauna of Croatia
Fauna of Slovenia
Oligotrophs
Postojna Cave
Proteidae
Taxa named by Josephus Nicolaus Laurenti